F. salicifolia may refer to:
 Faujasia salicifolia, a plant species in the genus Faujasia
 Ficus salicifolia, the willow-leaved fig tree, a tree species
 Fuchsia salicifolia, a flowering plant species in the genus Fuchsia

See also 
 Salicifolia (disambiguation)